Jonathan Richter (born 16 January 1985) is a Danish disabled professional football midfielder, who played for the Danish Superliga side FC Nordsjælland. He is the son of a Gambian father and a Danish mother and the twin brother of Simon Richter.

On 20 July 2009 while playing at Hvidovre Stadion, Richter was struck by lightning which resulted in cardiac arrest. As a result of the injuries sustained, Richter was supposed to stay in a medical induced coma until 29 July.

Medical staff at Hvidovre Hospital had hoped to be able to wake Richter from the coma soon after the accident but Richter's recovery was slower than hoped. This resulted in the doctors pushing back to bring Richter out of the coma twice.

Around August 1, Richter was taken out of the coma and on August 2, when doctors removed the last parts of the respirator equipment, Richter started to speak almost immediately. When club owner Allan K. Pedersen called Hvidovre Hospital to check on Richter, Richter himself told doctors to tell Allan K. Pedersen that everything was good.

In late August 2009, Richter and his medical advisors decided to amputate Richter's lower left leg. This has, according to medical sources, dramatically improved Richter's general well-being.

FC Nordsjælland retired Richter's number 26 after his forced retirement from football at the age of 24.

Richter serves on the board of Danish team FC Græsrødderne, who compete in the fourth tier of the Danish football.

References 

FC Nordsjælland profile
Official Danish Superliga stats

1985 births
Living people
Danish people of Gambian descent
Danish men's footballers
FC Nordsjælland players
Danish Superliga players
Danish twins
Twin sportspeople
Injuries from lightning strikes

Association football midfielders